Kuldeep Sharma (born 3 April 1957) is an Indian politician and a  member of Legislative assembly from Ganaur in Haryana. He was first elected  in 2009 Haryana Legislative assembly election as an Indian National Congress candidate, and served as the speaker of the house. Sharma was re-elected from the same constituency in the 2014 election.

References

Living people
People from Sonipat
Haryana MLAs 2009–2014
Haryana MLAs 2014–2019
1957 births